The Oman Hockey Association is the governing body of field hockey in Oman. It is affiliated to IHF International Hockey Federation and AHF Asian Hockey Federation. The headquarters of the federation are in Muscat.

Talib K Al Wahaibi is the President of the Oman Hockey Association and Redha Taqi Lawati is the General Secretary.

See also
 Oman men's national field hockey team

References

External links
 Oman Hockey Association

Oman
Hockey
Field hockey in Oman